The 1859 New Hampshire gubernatorial election was held on March 8, 1859.

Incumbent Republican Governor William Haile did not stand for re-election.

Republican nominee Ichabod Goodwin defeated Democratic nominee Asa P. Cate with 52.53% of the vote.

General election

Candidates
Asa P. Cate, Democratic, attorney, former President of the New Hampshire Senate, Democratic nominee for Governor in 1858
Ichabod Goodwin, Republican, former member of the New Hampshire House of Representatives, Whig nominee for Governor in 1856

Results

Notes

References

1859
New Hampshire
Gubernatorial